Apriona trilineata is a species of beetle in the family Cerambycidae. It was described by Chevrolat in 1852. It is known from India and Bangladesh.

References

Batocerini
Beetles described in 1852
Beetles of Asia